The 2018 Carinthian state election was held on 5 March 2018 to elect the members of the Landtag of Carinthia.

The centre-left Social Democratic Party of Austria (SPÖ) was the clear winner, taking 47.9% of votes, an eleven percentage point increase from 2013. The Freedom Party of Austria (FPÖ) gained six points, and the Austrian People's Party (ÖVP) gained one. This was enabled by a collapse in support for other parties: Team Carinthia, which had split from defunct Team Stronach, lost half its voteshare; The Greens tumbled from 12% to 3% and lost their representation; and the Alliance for the Future of Austria (BZÖ) collapsed from 6.4% to just 0.4%.

The SPÖ fell one seat short of an absolute majority, and held exploratory talks with the three other parties in the Landtag. They ultimately formed a coalition government with the ÖVP.

Background
Prior to amendments made in 2017, the Carinthian constitution mandated that cabinet positions in the state government be allocated between parties proportionally in accordance with the share of votes won by each; this is known as Proporz. As such, the government was a perpetual coalition of all parties that qualified for at least one cabinet position. In June 2017, the SPÖ, ÖVP, and Greens (all members of the government) as well as Team Carinthia voted to amend the constitution to remove this requirement. As such, the 2018 election was the first in post-war Carinthian history in which conventional coalition formation could take place.

In the 2013 election, the Freedom Party in Carinthia suffered the largest defeat of any party in Austrian history, falling from 45% to just 17%. Their collapse led to a highly fractious result, with five parties winning at least one state councillor. However, the SPÖ emerged as a clear victor with 37% of the vote. The FPK, having previously been the dominant party in the state, won only one state councillor. Shortly after the election, they voted to give up their independence and merge into the federal Freedom Party. The SPÖ subsequently formed a governing agreement with the ÖVP and Greens.

Electoral system
The 36 seats of the Landtag of Carinthia are elected via open list proportional representation in a two-step process. The seats are distributed between four multi-member constituencies. For parties to receive any representation in the Landtag, they must either win at least one seat in a constituency directly, or clear a 5 percent state-wide electoral threshold. Seats are distributed in constituencies according to the Hare quota, with any remaining seats allocated using the D'Hondt method at the state level, to ensure overall proportionality between a party's vote share and its share of seats.

Contesting parties
The table below lists parties represented in the previous Landtag.

In addition to the parties already represented in the Landtag, four parties collected enough signatures to be placed on the ballot.

 NEOS – The New Austria and Liberal Forum (NEOS)
 Communist Party of Austria (KPÖ) – on the ballot only in Klagenfurt, Carinthia East, and Villach
 Responsibility Earth (ERDE)
 FAIR (FAIR)

Opinion polling

Results

Results by constituency

Aftermath
After the election, the SPÖ began exploratory talks with the three other parties in the Landtag. By the beginning of April, a coalition agreement had been reached with the ÖVP. However, after ÖVP leader Christian Benger unexpectedly resigned a few days later, the SPÖ led by Kaiser demanded the coalition be renegotiated, fearing the new ÖVP leadership may renege on promises made by their predecessors. On 9 April, the coalition was finalised and presented.

References

External links

State elections in Austria
2018 elections in Austria